Arthur Henfrey may refer to:

 Arthur Henfrey (footballer) (1867–1929), English footballer
 Arthur Henfrey (botanist) (1819–1859), English surgeon and botanist